Chris Hanzsek is an American musical engineer and record producer, living in Snohomish, Washington.  He was co-founder, with then partner Tina Casale, of C/Z Records and their recording studio, Reciprocal Recording, in 1984.  He produced bands in the mid-1980s such as, The Melvins, Soundgarden, The U-Men, Malfunkshun, Skin Yard, and Green River, who can all be heard on C/Z's compilation album, Deep Six.

References

External links
Official site for Hanzsek A/V

American record producers
Living people
Year of birth missing (living people)
People from Snohomish, Washington